Dörffel may refer to:

 Alfred Dörffel (1821–1905), German pianist and music publisher
 Georg Dörffel (1914–1944), German Luftwaffe pilot
 Georg Samuel Dörffel (1643–1688), German astronomer and namesake of a lunar crater and a minor planet